CBVT-DT, virtual channel 11.1 (UHF digital channel 25), branded on-air as ICI Québec, is an Ici Radio-Canada Télé owned-and-operated station licensed to Quebec City, Quebec, Canada. The station is owned by the Canadian Broadcasting Corporation (known in French as Société Radio-Canada). CBVT-DT's studios are located on Rue Saint-Jean and Aut Dufferin Montmorency in the Quebec City borough of La Cité-Limoilou, and its transmitter is located on Avenue de la Montagne/Dumont Belair Ouest in Val-Bélair. On cable, the station is available on Vidéotron channel 2 and in high definition on digital channel 602. On satellite, it is carried on Bell Satellite TV channel 111 and in high definition on channel 1813.

History
The station, built and signed on by Radio-Canada itself, first aired on September 3, 1964. Quebec City's previous Radio-Canada affiliate CFCM-TV became an independent station for a few years before becoming one of the co-founders of TVA in 1971.

The station moved into new studios in 2004, uniting all of CBC/Radio-Canada's staff in Quebec City.

Programming
For the network, the station produces La semaine verte, an hour-long weekly newsmagazine about agriculture and rural life, and Second regard, a half-hour program exploring religion and spirituality.

For local programming, an evening newscast under the title Le Téléjournal/Québec, airs weekdays at 6:00 p.m.; a weekday noon newscast, Le Téléjournal midi/Québec et Est du Québec, is shared with Radio-Canada's group of stations in Eastern Quebec.

Digital television
After the analogue-to-digital conversion which took place on August 31, 2011, CBVT-DT stayed at its pre-transition position on channel 12, allowing CBVE-TV, a repeater of CBMT-DT Montreal, to move from channel 5 to channel 11. Because of potential interference from CFCF-DT in Montreal (which moved its digital signal to channel 12 on the transition date) and reception problems, CBVT-DT moved to channel 25 in December 2011. Channel 25 was previously used by CIVQ-DT, a local digital repeater of Télé-Québec.

Transmitters

CBVT had seven analogue television rebroadcasters in the communities near Quebec City.

Due to federal funding reductions to the CBC, in April 2012, the CBC responded with substantial budget cuts, which included shutting down CBC's and Radio-Canada's remaining analogue transmitters on July 31, 2012. None of CBC or Radio-Canada's television re-transmitters were converted to digital.

CBVT's main transmitter site for Quebec City is located at Mount Bélair.

References

External links
  
 
 

BVT-DT
BVT-DT
Television channels and stations established in 1964
1964 establishments in Quebec